Chris Chantler may refer to:

 Chris Chantler (writer), British comedy writer and performer
 Chris Chantler (footballer) (born 1990), English footballer